Ilija Bozoljac and Filip Krajinović were the defending champions, but only Krajinović returned to defend his title, partnering Mirza Bašić. They lost in the first round to Johan Brunström and Andreas Siljeström.

Gero Kretschmer and Alexander Satschko won the title after defeating Matteo Donati and Stefano Napolitano 6–1, 6–3 in the final.

Seeds

Draw

References
 Main Draw

Capri Watch Cup - Doubles